Maksim Vladimirovich Tarasov (born 2 December 1970 in Yaroslavl, Soviet Union) is a retired Russian pole vaulter. He is the Russian national record holder for pole vault, with 6.05, result achieved in 1996.

Biography
Tarasov represented the USSR, the Unified Team, and later Russia. 

His personal best jump is 6.05 metres, which puts him fourth in the all-time performers list. 

Tarasov was the surprise Gold medalist at the 1992 Summer Olympics, representing the Unified Team, over favourite Ukrainian teammate Sergey Bubka, who missed all the attempts at the final. 

He represented Russia at the 2000 Summer Olympics, winning a Bronze medal. 

A serious injury forced him to leave competition in 2001.

Achievements

See also
 6 metres club

References

External links
 

1970 births
Living people
Sportspeople from Yaroslavl
Russian male pole vaulters
Soviet male pole vaulters
Athletes (track and field) at the 1992 Summer Olympics
Athletes (track and field) at the 2000 Summer Olympics
Olympic athletes of the Unified Team
Olympic athletes of Russia
Olympic gold medalists for the Unified Team
Olympic bronze medalists for Russia
World Athletics Championships medalists
European Athletics Championships medalists
Medalists at the 2000 Summer Olympics
Medalists at the 1992 Summer Olympics
Olympic gold medalists in athletics (track and field)
Olympic bronze medalists in athletics (track and field)
Goodwill Games medalists in athletics
World Athletics Championships winners
Competitors at the 1994 Goodwill Games